Dr. Kailesh Kumar Singh Jagutpal, more commonly known as Kailesh Jagutpal (born 1 November 1969) is a Mauritian politician.

Early life, education & medical career
Kailesh Jagutpal grew up in the village of Grand Bois which is located in the district of Savanne District in the south of Mauritius. He attended the Sookdeo Bissoondoyal State Secondary School before completing his secondary education at the Royal College Curepipe. Then he studied medicine at Patna Medical College and Hospital in Bihar, India before returning to Mauritius where he joined the Civil Service as Medical and Health Officer. From 2004 to 2006 he specialised in Psychiatry by studying at the Banaras Hindu University in Varanasi, India before returning to Mauritius. In addition to his role as psychiatrist at the Jawaharlal Nehru Hospital in Rose Belle he was also elected as Chairman of the Medical Council of Mauritius, a position which he held from 2016 to 2019.

Political career
At the 07 November 2019 general elections Kailesh Jagutpal stood as candidate of the MSM within the L'Alliance Morisien. He was elected as First Member for Constituency No.13 Rivière des Anguilles-Souillac in the National Assembly. On 12 November 2019 he was appointed Minister of Health and Wellness. Within this portfolio he is responsible for medical and public health services, population planning, quality of Life and population wellness, national AIDS secretariat, trust fund for specialised medical care, Mauritius Institute of Health and licensing of private health institutions.

References

1969 births
Living people
Mauritian physicians
Government ministers of Mauritius
Banaras Hindu University people
Members of the National Assembly (Mauritius)
Militant Socialist Movement politicians
Mauritian Hindus
Mauritian politicians of Indian descent